The Rape of Richard Beck (also known as Deadly Justice) is a 1985 American television film.

Plot
Richard Beck (Richard Crenna) is a police detective who believes that rape victims are "asking for it". When he is raped by two male suspects, he comes to question this belief.

Cast

Awards and nominations
Eddie Awards
 1986: Won, Best Edited Television Special, Millie Moore and Maurie Beck

Emmy Awards
 1985: Won, Outstanding Lead Actor in a Limited Series or a Special, Richard Crenna

Golden Globe Awards
 1986: Nominated, Best Performance by an Actor in a Mini-Series or Motion Picture Made for TV, Richard Crenna

References

External links

1985 television films
1985 films
1985 crime drama films
ABC network original films
American crime drama films
American television films
Films about rape
Films directed by Karen Arthur
1980s English-language films
1980s American films